Colchester Hunt is an unincorporated community in Fairfax County, Virginia, United States. Colchester Hunt is located close to the town of Clifton and the independent city of Fairfax.

History

1970s 
The community was formed in the 1970s on what had been farm land, making it one of the first major communities near the town of Clifton, Virginia. A distinguishing characteristic is the placement of the houses on the lots. Rather than being centered on the lots, the houses typically are set in one corner—resulting in some houses having very large side or back yards, with others having very large front yards. The houses were built with septic tanks, and still use that system. Although the houses initially were all-electric, gas mains were extended to the area and many houses converted to gas.

1980s 
During the 1980s, the community went through rapid growth and development. More streets and homes were added to the area, and the present-day Fairfax Hunt was constructed.

1990s 
The 1990s were about the time the community went to its maximum capacity of about 400 residents and 97 homes in the community. In 1998, an F0 tornado rolled right through the southern tier of the community. No homes were destroyed, but around 25 trees were knocked over. No deaths or injuries were reported.

Today 
Today, the community's main roads are Saddle Horn Drive and Queen's Brigade Drive with other roads supporting them. It is served by Oak View Elementary School and by Robinson Secondary School. Fairfax Hunt is served by Fairfax High School.

See also 
 Clifton, Virginia
 Fairfax, Virginia
 Lewis Park, Virginia
 Vannoy Park, Virginia

References 

Unincorporated communities in Virginia
Unincorporated communities in Fairfax County, Virginia
Washington metropolitan area
Fairfax, Virginia
Clifton, Virginia